Phoebe Robinson (born September 28, 1984) is an American comedian, New York Times best-selling writer, and actress based in New York City.

Early life and education
Robinson grew up in Bedford Heights and Solon, Ohio. She attended high school at Gilmour Academy. Her brother, Phil Robinson, is a member of the Ohio House of Representatives. In 2002, Robinson went to college at Pratt Institute in New York City where she studied screenwriting.

Career

Robinson was a staff writer for MTV's Girl Code and a consultant on season three  of Broad City. She is a regular contributor to Glamour, and has been published in The New York Times, Bitch, Vanity Fair, and many publications. Her blog, Blaria (named for "Black Daria"), has been featured in The Huffington Post, and Robinson has regularly performed a live version of, Blaria Live, in Brooklyn and Washington, D.C. With Jessica Williams, she is the creator and co-host of the 2 Dope Queens podcast and HBO series, and she created and starred in Refinery29's web series Woke Bae.

She has made numerous television appearances, including on NBC's Last Comic Standing, the Today show, Late Night with Seth Meyers, and Last Call with Carson Daly, Comedy Central's Broad City, @midnight, and The Nightly Show with Larry Wilmore, FX's Totally Biased with W. Kamau Bell, VH1's Big Morning Buzz Live, and others. She has been named by Vulture, Essence, Esquire, Flavorwire, Brooklyn Magazine, and SF Sketchfest as a comedian to watch.

Her solo podcast, Sooo Many White Guys, premiered on July 12, 2016. As a response to the predominance of white males in comedy, the podcast features women, people of color, and LGBTQ people. Ilana Glazer of Broad City serves as an executive producer.

Her first book, You Can't Touch My Hair (And Other Things I Still Have to Explain), debuted on October 4, 2016. Her second book, Everything's Trash, But It's Okay, was released on October 16, 2018. She had a supporting role in the 2018 comedy Ibiza.

In August 2019, it was announced that she will star in and executive produce an interview show on Comedy Central. It will be the first project from her production company, Tiny Reparations.

Robinson's third book, Please Don't Sit on My Bed in Your Outside Clothes, was published by Tiny Reparations Books on September 28, 2021.

In July 2022, Robinson's television show Everything's Trash debuted on the channel Freeform. Robinson stars as Phoebe, a podcast host facing down adulthood while her older brother (Jordan Carlos) runs for state office.

Robinson lives and performs in Brooklyn, New York.

Filmography

Film

Television

Web

Music videos

Bibliography

References

External links 
 
 

American women comedians
African-American stand-up comedians
American stand-up comedians
Living people
People from Solon, Ohio
Comedians from Ohio
1984 births
American women podcasters
American podcasters
Pratt Institute alumni
Writers from Ohio
21st-century American comedians
People from Bedford Heights, Ohio
21st-century American women
21st-century African-American women
21st-century African-American people
20th-century African-American people
20th-century African-American women